Vrapce may refer to:

 Vrapce, Medveđa, town in the municipality of Medveđa, Serbia
 Vrapče (disambiguation), several settlements in Bosnia, Croatia and Serbia